Hopeful Tragedy Records is a 2007 formed Quebec-based Record label founded by Your Favorite Enemies.

The label was founded for promoting their first EP called And If I Was To Die In The Morning… Would I Still Be Sleeping With You which was released on 1 June 2007. Their second EP Love Is A Promise Whispering Goodbye followed one year later.
Nowadays the label have more artists on contract.

Artists 
 10 After 10
 Biosphere
 Your Favorite Enemies
 DJ B Redemption
 Carabine
 Leeman
 Pinkie
 Osaka Motel
 The Invisible Rainbow
 Salament
 DJ White
 Zörg

External links 
 

Rock record labels
Canadian independent record labels
Companies based in Quebec City
Quebec record labels
Record labels established in 2007